Orli Prostějov was a professional basketball club from Prostějov, Czech Republic. The club played in the NBL, the first tier of Czech basketball. In 2015, Prostějov won its first trophy in the Czech Republic Basketball Cup. In 2017, the team was declared bankrupt and left the NBL. They were replaced by a new established club in the city BK Olomoucko.

Trophies
 Czech Republic Basketball Cup
Winners (1): 2014–15

Season by season

Players

Current roster

Notable players

 Hurl Beechum

External links 
Official Site 
Eurobasket.com Team Page

Defunct basketball teams in the Czech Republic
Basketball teams established in 1940
Basketball teams disestablished in 2017
Orli